Karl-Heinz von Liebezeit (born 10 July 1960 in Karlsruhe, West Germany) is a German television actor.

Selected filmography
 Derrick - Season 9, Episode 6: "Das Alibi" (1982)

External links

Trusted Agents Berlin 

1960 births
Living people
German male television actors
20th-century German male actors
21st-century German male actors
Actors from Karlsruhe